Noah Gideon Segan (born October 5, 1983) is an American actor. He is best known for his work in the films Looper, Brick, and Deadgirl.  He is known for his many collaborations with filmmaker Rian Johnson.

Early life
Segan was born in New York City. He is the grandson of American photographer Arthur Rothstein, the nephew of musician Rob Stoner.

Career
Segan has appeared in television programs, including Days of Our Lives, CSI: Crime Scene Investigation and House, and the voice of Henry on the Nickelodeon cartoon KaBlam!.

In 2008, Brick director Rian Johnson invited Segan to play a small role in his second film, The Brothers Bloom. In 2012, Segan had a supporting lead role in Johnson's third film, Looper. In 2013, he had a small role on Breaking Bad, as a fireman in the episode "Ozymandias", directed by Johnson. In April 2016, Johnson added Segan to the cast of Star Wars: The Last Jedi. Segan joined the cast of Johnson's Knives Out in December 2018, playing the supporting role of Trooper Wagner.

Segan produced and starred in the independent feature films Redeemer, Some Kind of Hate, Quit, and Someone's Knocking at the Door, and has directed numerous music videos. He appeared in the music videos for "C'mon Let Me Ride" and "Final Warning", both songs for Skylar Grey. In 2014, Segan starred alongside in the horror thriller film Starry Eyes. In 2015, he starred in the thriller film Follow, and played a role in the sci-fi revenge thriller The Mind's Eye. In June 2015, he appeared in the music video for "You Don't Know Me" by Son Lux.

Segan has appeared twice on The George Lucas Talk Show, first during the May the AR Be LI$$ You Arli$$ marathon fundraiser, and later on The George Lucas Holiday Special.

Filmography

Film

Television

References

External links

1983 births
Male actors from New York City
American male child actors
American male film actors
American male soap opera actors
American male television actors
Living people